Hygeia House is a historic vacation home on Beach Avenue on Block Island (New Shoreham, Rhode Island).

It is a 2-3 story wood-frame structure, four bays wide, with a mansard roof.  The building presents  stories to the front, with a row of four dormers in the roof, and a porch extending the full width of the front, and wrapping around to the right to join a projecting section of the main block.

It was moved here in 1907, to what were then the grounds of the Hygeia Hotel, a much larger hotel which burned down in 1916.

The Hygeia's previous owner, Dr. John Champlin, had his medical office in this building, and continued to rent rooms to summer visitors.  It was used as employee housing for other tourist facilities for many years.

The building was listed on the National Register of Historic Places in 2001.

See also
National Register of Historic Places listings in Washington County, Rhode Island

References

New Shoreham, Rhode Island
Buildings and structures in Washington County, Rhode Island
Houses completed in 1885
Hotel buildings on the National Register of Historic Places in Rhode Island
Houses on the National Register of Historic Places in Rhode Island
National Register of Historic Places in Washington County, Rhode Island
1885 establishments in Rhode Island
Second Empire architecture in Rhode Island
Victorian architecture in Rhode Island